Interxion is a European provider of carrier and cloud-neutral colocation data centre services. Founded in 1998 in the Netherlands, the firm was publicly listed on the New York Stock Exchange from 28 January 2011 until its acquisition by Digital Realty in March 2020. Interxion is headquartered in Schiphol-Rijk, the Netherlands, and delivers its services through 53 data centres in 11 European countries located in major metropolitan areas, including Dublin, London, Frankfurt, Paris, Amsterdam, and Madrid, the 6 main data centre markets in Europe, as well as Marseille, Interxion’s Internet Gateway.

The company's core offering is carrier-neutral colocation, which includes provision of space, power and a secure environment in which to house customers’ computing, network, storage and IT infrastructure. Interxion also supplements its core colocation offering with a number of additional services, including systems monitoring, systems management, engineering support services, data back-up and storage.

Within its data centres, Interxion enables approximately 1,500 customers to house their equipment and connect to a broad range of telecommunications carriers, ISPs and other customers. The data centres act as content and connectivity hubs that facilitate the processing, storage, sharing and distribution of data, content, applications and media among carriers and customers.

Interxion's customer base is in high-growth market segments, including financial services, cloud and managed services providers, digital media and carriers. Customers in these target markets enable expansion of existing communities of interest and build new, high-value communities of interest within the data centre. Communities of interest are particularly important to customers in each of these market segments. For example, customers in the digital media segment benefit from the close proximity to content delivery network providers and Internet exchanges in order to rapidly deliver content to consumers. Interxion expects the high-value and reduced-cost benefits of communities of interest to continue to attract new customers.

Interxion's data centres enable its customers to connect to more than 500 carriers and ISPs and 20 European Internet exchanges, allowing them to lower telecommunications costs and reduce latency times.

Communities of interest
Interxion focuses its efforts on attracting customers in well-defined sectors of industry:

Digital media
Interxion has created content hubs across its European data centre footprint. The hubs allow organisations to aggregate, exchange, store, manage, and distribute content in addition to interconnecting with a large digital media community, helping to optimise distribution and minimize costs.

Financial services
Interxion has created financial hubs across key European financial markets, including London, Paris, Amsterdam, Frankfurt, Dublin and Stockholm. The hubs consist of highly interactive and extensive communities of capital market participants, including a range of algorithmic and high-frequency traders, brokers, hedge funds, exchanges, multilateral trading facilities, market data providers and clearing houses. The financial hubs are accessible via a wide range of carriers and high bandwidth fibre connectivity providers.

Cloud
Interxion has created cloud hubs across its European footprint, creating an optimum environment for cost-effective development, launch and management of cloud-based services for enterprises, systems integrators and cloud service providers. The hubs also enable fast, easy interconnection with one of Europe's largest and fastest-growing community of cloud operators.

Carriers and network providers
Interxion works with many carriers, network providers and Internet Service Providers as well as 20 Internet exchanges, neutral Ethernet exchanges, CDN’s and over 500 carriers. Existing Interxion customers can interconnect data centres to any of these parties via a simple cross connect using the Ethernet platform within Interxion data centres.

History
European Telecom Exchange BV was incorporated on 6 April 1998, and (after being renamed Interxion Holding B.V. on 12 June 1998) was converted into Interxion Holding N.V. on 11 January 2000. Interxion completed its IPO on the New York Stock Exchange (NYSE) on 28 January 2011. Interxion was founded by Bart van den Dries. The first round of venture capital was provided by Residex together with some informal investors.

In February 2015, it was announced that UK-based data center operator Telecity would merge with Interxion, purchasing it in a $2.2 billion deal, thus creating a joint data-center operator, with a combined value of $4.5 billion. According to the two CEOs, a deal promised to deliver around $600 million in synergy savings. In May 2015, US data company Equinix announced it would be acquiring TelecityGroup for £2.35 billion ($3.6 billion), which would terminate Telecity's deal with Interxion.

On 15 October 2015 the Montreuil  ordered Interxion to stop using the La Courneuve data centre because of noise pollution concerns raised by the inhabitants.

In October 2019, Digital Realty and Interxion announced the acquisition of Interxion by Digital Realty for $8.4 billion to “create a leading global provider of data centre, colocation and interconnection solutions”.

In November 2019, Interxion announced a new contract deployment from global Infrastructure-as-a-Service provider Voxility for its campus in Madrid, reaching more than 90 carriers in this hub alone.

In Q1 2020, Interxion acquired 70% of icolo.io, a Kenyan data centre company and in 2021 acquired controlling stakes of Medallion, a leading data centre operator in Nigeria.

Industry standards and accreditations
Interxion is certified with BS 25999, the British Standards Institution (BSI) standard for business continuity management. This has been integrated with Interxion's existing Information Security Management System (ISMS) certification ISO 27001:2005 standard for all of its European country operations. In addition, the company's European Customer Service Centre (ECSC) team has now been trained in ITIL v3, the latest ITIL standard.

BS 25999 is the world's first business continuity management (BCM) standard, developed to minimise the risks of disruptions, which can impact a business. The standard is designed to keep businesses operational during challenging times by protecting staff, preserving reputations and providing the ability to keep trading.

Interxion's development of a BCM system involved integrating with the already established Information Security Management System, ISO 27001, an internationally recognised certification designed to assess levels of risk across an entire company's data centre network.

Awards
In 2010 Interxion's Technology and Engineering Group was recognised for its “Outstanding Contribution to the Data Centre Sector” at the sixth annual Data Centre Europe awards ceremony held at Espaces Antipolis in Nice, France. Interxion was nominated in the Green I.T. Awards 2011 as a finalist for “IT Operator of the Year”.

Memberships
Interxion is a member of the following organisations:
 RIPE
Euro-IX
 Irish Internet Association
 The Green Grid – Contributor Member
 The Green Grid – Advisory Council
 The Uptime Institute

Colocation services

Security
Interxion data centre buildings are typically designed with five layers of physical security: the perimeter fence, the security gate and entrance, mantraps into the data centre, access systems into the rooms, and secure, locked cabinets. Clients can introduce additional levels, such as lockable cages or cubes (containment aisles), as required. No one enters or leaves the data centre without proof of identities, such as a national ID, passport, or driving license; and all visitors are checked against customer-defined access lists. There are multiple physical security layers, including CCTV, man traps , and 24x7 controlled access. All building areas are secured by an alarm system, and an external security firm patrols the area, both inside and outside. Interxion utilises ISO 27001certified information security management systems.

Power
Interxion provides managed power with resilience built in all the way to the cabinet and server if required and a minimum  N+1 configuration on power infrastructure with facilities such as high-speed refuelling. The continuously improving design specification supports a modular build, including critical infrastructure. Extra equipment can be added to the infrastructure to increase capacity without causing outages.

Controlled environment
All equipment is maintained and continuously monitored in a climate-controlled environment. The average temperature inside the cold aisle is controlled between 18 and 25 °C and a humidity level of 50% ± 10%. Multiple air conditioning units provide redundant capacity. Early warning systems installed as standard detect hot spots before they become a problem.

Energy efficiency
After joining the Green Grid association in 2008 and becoming a Contributor Member and part of the Advisory Council, Interxion has committed to continuously investigate efficiency opportunities such as free cooling as standard, ground water cooling, and waste heat re-use. Continuous monitoring and measuring provides information about the environments and enables identification of opportunities to improve efficiency. The flexible design provides a scalable infrastructure model.

Connectivity
Interxion connects to more than 400 individual carriers and ISPs as well as 18 European Internet exchanges. This is part of the carrier-neutral data centre concept.

Carriers
Interxion hosts global Tier 1, regional Tier 2 and national Tier 3 networks with direct access to the  backbone infrastructure and PoP’s for over 400 carriers across its European footprint. These carriers are present at Interxion’s data centres both to interconnect to other carriers but also to take advantage of the customer communities within the data centres.

Internet exchanges
Internet exchanges are the major points on the Internet where networks interconnect. They serve as an exchange point for the traffic of the Internet via bi-lateral, settlement-free peering agreements. Interxion houses 18 such Internet exchanges in Europe. Interxion is an active supporter of the public Internet exchanges and was an active participant in the creation of Euro-IX.

See also
 Data center
 Cloud computing
 Colocation centre
 Internet exchange point
 Peering

References

External links
 Interxion official website

Companies formerly listed on the New York Stock Exchange
Data centers
2011 initial public offerings
Real estate companies established in 1998
Telecommunications companies established in 1998
Real estate companies of the Netherlands
Telecommunications companies of the Netherlands
Companies based in Amsterdam
2020 mergers and acquisitions
Dutch companies established in 1998